Gregor Alan Olson (born March 1, 1963) is an American football coach who is the quarterbacks coach for the Seattle Seahawks of the National Football League (NFL). He has been an offensive coordinator for the Detroit Lions, St. Louis Rams, Tampa Bay Buccaneers, Oakland Raiders, Jacksonville Jaguars, and the Oakland / Las Vegas Raiders.

Coaching career

Early career
Olson was offensive coordinator and quarterback coach at Central Washington University from 1990–1993, where he coached quarterback Jon Kitna, who later played sixteen seasons in the NFL. While at Central, Olson also coached the wrestling team. Prior to joining the CWU coaching staff, he was a graduate assistant at Washington State University for three seasons; he coached the defensive backs for a season and was the linebacker coach for two years.  He also coached running backs at Spokane Falls Community College in 1986.

After leaving CWU, Olson coached quarterbacks at the University of Idaho for three seasons, then moved on to Purdue University in July 1997.

Purdue University
At Purdue, Olson played a key role in helping OC Jim Chaney in the development of future Pro Bowler and Super Bowl-winning quarterback Drew Brees. Under Chaney and Olson, Brees was a Heisman Trophy finalist in 1999 and 2000 while winning the Maxwell Award as the nation's most outstanding player in 2000, as the Boilermakers won the Big Ten title and met Washington in the Rose Bowl.

Olson previously served as the quarterbacks coach of the Detroit Lions, where he worked with Joey Harrington.  He served as Lions offensive coordinator following the firing of Steve Mariucci and the demotion of Ted Tollner during the 2005 season.

St. Louis Rams
He was the offensive coordinator of the St. Louis Rams from 2006-2007. In his first year with the Rams in 2006, he helped guide a high-powered offense that ranked sixth in the NFL in total offense (360.4 yards per game) and a passing offense that ranked third (247.6) in the NFC. Under Olson's direction the Rams became just the fourth team in NFL history to produce a 4,000 yard passer (Marc Bulger), a 1,500 yard rusher (Steven Jackson) and two 1,000 yard receivers (Torry Holt and Isaac Bruce). Bulger, Holt and Bruce were all selected to the Pro Bowl. Bulger also posted career-highs in passing yards (4,301), passing touchdowns (24), and passing attempts (588) and completions (370) while ranking second in the NFL in interception percentage (1.4%). Jackson also had a career-year in 2006, leading the NFL in yards from scrimmage with 2,334, and he led all NFL running backs with 90 receptions and was fifth in the NFL in rushing yards with 1,528.

Tampa Bay Buccaneers
In January 2008, Olson was hired by the Tampa Bay Buccaneers to be their quarterbacks coach following the dismissal of Paul Hackett.  On September 3, 2009, the day before the team's final preseason game, the Buccaneers announced that Olson would replace Jeff Jagodzinski as Offensive Coordinator. Olson was responsible for the development of QB Josh Freeman, the 17th overall pick in the 2009 draft. Under Olson's guidance, Freeman threw for 8,898 yards and 51 touchdowns in his first three seasons as a starter. In 2011, Freeman ranked eighth in the NFL with a 62.8 completion percentage and 13th with 3,592 passing yards. In Olson's second season as offensive coordinator with the Bucs in 2010, Freeman ranked sixth in the NFL with a 95.9 passer rating while throwing for 3,451 yards, 25 touchdowns and only six interceptions. Olson helped guide the Buccaneers to one of their best offensive seasons in team history, setting franchise records for yards per play (5.61), average per rush (4.64 yards), average per pass play (7.21), passer rating (96.2) and fewest interceptions thrown (six). The Buccaneers also finished with the fourth-most points scored (341), third-most yards in total offense (5,362) and second-best third down percentage (42.2%) in a single season in team history.

The Buccaneers were the youngest team in the NFL in 2010 and WR Mike Williams, a fourth-round draft pick, finished the year leading all rookie receivers in the league in every major receiving category while setting a single-season team record with 11 touchdown receptions. RB LeGarrette Blount's 1,007 rushing yards led all rookie running backs and he became just the second undrafted rookie running back in NFL history to finish with over 1,000 yards. It marked the first time since 1968 that a team had two different players lead all rookies in rushing and receiving yards.
 He was fired on January 2, 2012, after his team posted a 4–12 record.

Stints with the Jacksonville Jaguars and Oakland Raiders
In January 2012, Olson was hired to be the Assistant Head coach/quarterbacks coach for the Jacksonville Jaguars.

In January 2013, Olson was hired to be the offensive coordinator of the Oakland Raiders, taking over for the recently fired Greg Knapp.

In 2014, Olson was fired as offensive coordinator of the Oakland Raiders.

On January 21, 2015, Olson was hired to be the offensive coordinator of the Jacksonville Jaguars.

On October 29, 2016, Olson was fired from Jaguars following a loss to the Tennessee Titans.

Los Angeles Rams
On January 18, 2017, it was announced by the Los Angeles Times that Olson would be hired by the Los Angeles Rams to serve as the quarterbacks coach, under head coach Sean McVay.

Return to Raiders
Following the Rams' elimination from the playoffs, Olson returned to the Oakland Raiders as their offensive coordinator under returning head coach Jon Gruden in January 2018. Olson missed the team's week 15 game in 2020 against the Los Angeles Chargers after he tested positive for COVID-19. For the 2021 season, Olson continued to coach under Gruden and later interim head coach Rich Bisaccia, but was not retained under new head coach Josh McDaniels.

Return to Rams
In 2022, Olson was an offensive assistant for the Los Angeles Rams.

References

1963 births
Living people
American people of Norwegian descent
Central Washington Wildcats football coaches
Chicago Bears coaches
Detroit Lions coaches
Idaho Vandals football coaches
Los Angeles Rams coaches
National Football League offensive coordinators
Jacksonville Jaguars coaches
Oakland Raiders coaches
Las Vegas Raiders coaches
People from Richland, Washington
Purdue Boilermakers football coaches
San Francisco 49ers coaches
Seattle Seahawks coaches
St. Louis Rams coaches
Tampa Bay Buccaneers coaches
Washington State Cougars football coaches